Cian Ciarán (born 16 June 1976) is a Welsh musician best known as the keyboard player in the band Super Furry Animals. In addition to keyboards, he plays guitar and drums and sings, and is a songwriter, composer and producer.

Career
Cian was born in Bangor, Wales.  Prior to the formation of Super Furry Animals, he played in the electronica groups Wwzz and Aros Mae. He has been a member of techno collective Acid Casuals and is currently producing under the names Paps, Kirkland and as himself. He has guested with, produced and mixed several artists, including Kaiser Chiefs, Mogwai, and Manic Street Preachers.

His first solo single "Martina Franca", was released in June 2012, with the full album, Outside In, released in July 2012 on Strangetown Records. Ciarán's second solo album, They Are Nothing Without Us, was released in 2013.

In 2013 and 2014 Ciarán took part in several anti-nuclear and pro-clean energy protests, including a solo performance at the top of a wind turbine in Norfolk in September 2013. In 2013, he travelled to Fukushima, Japan to witness the devastation from the nuclear power plant meltdown in the wake of the 2011 earthquake and tsunami. He appeared as a guest on the Channel 5 programme The Wright Stuff in 2013 to discuss his views.

Ciarán is also label manager for SomBom and Strangetown Records. As part of Strange Village, a television production company, Cian and his brother Dafydd Ieuan were presented with a BAFTA Cymru Award for the soundtrack to Pen Talar, and were nominated for awards in 2012 for Alys and 2013 for Gerallt.

Personal life
Cian's brother is musician Dafydd Ieuan and he also has two sisters. His father, Dr. Carl Iwan Clowes, OBE, was an anti-nuclear campaigner, health consultant and official consulate in Wales for African country Lesotho. His mother's name is Dorothi. Cian's partner is musician Estelle Ios. The two lead the band Zefur Wolves, while Ios is also a member of the group Baby Queens, which Cian manages as part of Strangetown Records.

Campaigner
In September 2018, Ciaran launched a legal challenge against the decision by EDF to dredge mud from the seabed near the Hinkley Point C building site in Somerset, and dump it in the Bristol Channel near Cardiff Bay. On behalf of the Campaign Against Hinkley Mud Dumping, he submitted an application for an interim injunction against the dumping.

Discography

Solo albums
Outside In (2012) Dell'Orso Records
They Are Nothing Without Us (2013) Strangetown Records
Rhys a Meinir (2016) Strangetown Records 
20 Millisieverts Per Year (2018) Strangetown Records

Acid Casuals
"Omni" (2006) Placid Casual Recordings

Ciaran & Wilding
"Missing Her" / "Stuck in the Middle" (singles, 2014) Strangetown Records

Filmography
2000 Beautiful Mistake (Camgymeriad Gwych) (with Super Furry Animals) (himself)
2004 9 Songs (with Super Furry Animals) (himself)

References

External links
Acid Casuals at SomBom website
 

1976 births
Living people
Welsh keyboardists
Super Furry Animals members
Welsh-language singers
People from Bangor, Gwynedd
People educated at Ysgol David Hughes